The Texas A&M University System is a state university system in Texas and is one of the state's six independent university systems.

The Texas A&M University System is one of the largest systems of higher education in the United States, with a budget of $6.3 billion. Through a statewide network of 11 universities and eight state agencies, and the RELLIS Campus, the Texas A&M System educates more than 153,000 students and makes more than 22 million additional educational contacts through service and outreach programs each year. System-wide, research and development expenditures exceeded $996 million in FY 2017 and helped drive the state's economy.

The system's flagship institution is Texas A&M University in College Station. The letters "A&M", originally A.M.C. and short for "Agricultural and Mechanical College", are retained as a tribute to the university's former designation.



Component institutions
The founding member of the A&M System is Texas A&M University, established in 1876. Prairie View A&M, also established in 1876, is an HBCU. Many of the member universities and agencies joined the A&M System decades after being established. Its flagship institution is Texas A&M University. The institution now named The University of Texas at Arlington was a member from 1917 to 1965.

Agencies
With a direct presence in all 254 Texas counties, A&M System agencies offer research and service to the state's citizens. The agencies focus on addressing and improving the social, economic, educational, health and environmental conditions of Texans.
 Texas A&M AgriLife Research
 Texas A&M AgriLife Extension Service
 Texas A&M Engineering Experiment Station
 Texas A&M Engineering Extension Service
 Texas A&M Forest Service 
 Texas A&M Transportation Institute
 Texas A&M Veterinary Medical Diagnostic Laboratory
Texas Division of Emergency Management, transferred from Texas DPS to TAMUS in 2019.

Health Science Center

Established in 1999, the HSC is a part of Texas A&M University and reaches across all parts of Texas through its six components: Texas A&M University College of Dentistry at Dallas; the College of Medicine at College Station, Temple, Dallas, Round Rock, and Houston; the Graduate School of Biomedical Sciences at Dallas, College Station and Houston; the Institute of Biosciences and Technology at Houston; the School of Public Health at College Station and McAllen; and the latest addition, the Irma Lerma Rangel College of Pharmacy at Kingsville. Southern regions of the state also are further served by the Coastal Bend Health Education Center, which covers the 19-county region surrounding Corpus Christi and Kingsville, and the South Texas Center at McAllen.

The HSC received full accreditation in December 2002 from the Southern Association of Colleges and Schools to award baccalaureate, master's, doctoral and professional degrees. Its components are accredited by accrediting organizations specific to their areas.

The Health Science Center in 2013 was merged into Texas A&M University proper and is no longer an independent institution.

Academic units
 Texas A&M Baylor College of Dentistry
 Texas A&M Health Science Center College of Medicine
 Texas A&M Health Science Center Graduate School of Biomedical Sciences
 Institute of Biosciences and Technology 
 Texas A&M Health Science Center Irma Lerma Rangel College of Pharmacy
 Texas A&M Health Science Center School of Public Health

Regional centers
 Texas A&M Health Science Center Coastal Bend Over Health Education Center 
 Texas A&M Health Science Center South Texas Center

Governance and administration

The System is governed by a nine-member Board of Regents.  Each member is appointed by the Governor of Texas for a six-year term and the terms overlap (all terms end on February 1 in odd-numbered years and in those years 1/3 of the regents' terms expire, though a regent can be nominated for another subsequent term).

In addition, a tenth "student regent" (non-voting member) is appointed by the Governor for a one-year term.

The responsibilities of the Texas A&M University System Board of Regents are to:

Oversee the administration and set policy direction for the System's 11 universities, seven state agencies and health science center;
Ensure a quality undergraduate and graduate education experience for all students;
Promote academic research and technology to benefit the state of Texas and the nation;
Disseminate programs of the A&M System across the state through outreach and public service efforts; and
Support the state legislative and higher education leadership to position Texas at the forefront of higher education nationally.

Additionally, the Texas A&M University System is a member of the Alliance for Biosecurity, a public-private coalition that "advocates for public policies and funding to support the rapid development, production, stockpiling, and distribution of critically needed medical countermeasures".

References

External links

 

 
 
College Station, Texas
Public university systems in the United States
Universities and colleges accredited by the Southern Association of Colleges and Schools
Educational institutions established in 1948
1948 establishments in Texas